Elisabeth of Sicily (1261–1303) was Queen of Hungary by marriage to Ladislaus IV of Hungary.

Life
She was the youngest child of Charles I of Naples and his first wife Beatrice of Provence.

Elisabeth married Ladislaus IV of Hungary in 1270. They had no children.  Ladislaus had neglected Elisabeth for the sake of his semi-pagan tribe, the Cumans; his mother Elizabeth was a member of the Cuman tribe. Ladislaus always wore Cuman dress and many of his friends were Cumans.

Queen
Ladislaus spent most of his marriage to Elisabeth chasing after the Cumans, encouraging them to come and live in Hungary. Ladislaus clearly preferred the society of the semi-heathen Cumans to that of the Christians; he wore, and made his court wear, Cuman dress; surrounded himself with Cuman concubines, and neglected and ill-used his ill-favoured Neapolitan consort. When they wanted to leave Hungary, Ladislaus used his forces to make them stay. Elisabeth was arrested in 1286 so that Ladislaus could live with a Cuman mistress. She was imprisoned at Margaret Island, where she stayed for the next three years. Ladislaus finally reconciled with Elisabeth in 1289. When he found he did not have enough power to rule over his barons, he rejoined the Cumans.

Ladislaus died in 1290, childless, and he was succeeded by Andrew III of Hungary; Andrew was a distant cousin of Ladislaus.

Later life
After her husband's death, Elisabeth returned to Naples, but she came back to Hungary. In the year 1294 Queen Fenenna confirmed on her the privilege to collect the donations of the church in the Veszprém County. In 1301 she returned to Naples, where she became a Dominican nun at St Peter's monastery (San Pietro a Castello), which had been founded by her sister-in-law Queen Mary. Queen Elisabeth (Isabella d'Anjou) died in 1303 and was buried at the monastery of St Peter's.

Ancestry

Sources

1261 births
1303 deaths
Capetian House of Anjou
House of Anjou-Hungary
House of Árpád
Hungarian queens consort
Charles I of Anjou
Daughters of kings
13th-century Neapolitan people